Group 2 of the 1970 FIFA World Cup was contested in the Estadio Cuauhtémoc and Estadio Nemesio Díez between 2 and 11 June 1970. Italy won the group, and advanced to the quarter-finals, along with Uruguay, who finished second by virtue of goal difference. Sweden and Israel failed to advance.

Standings

Matches
All times local (UTC−6)

Uruguay vs Israel

Italy vs Sweden

Uruguay vs Italy

Sweden vs Israel

Sweden vs Uruguay

Italy vs Israel

References

Group 2
Sweden at the 1970 FIFA World Cup
Uruguay at the 1970 FIFA World Cup
Italy at the 1970 FIFA World Cup
Israel at the 1970 FIFA World Cup